The Hilton Milwaukee City Center is a historic Art Deco-style hotel opened in 1928 and located in the Westown neighborhood of downtown Milwaukee, Wisconsin. It is owned by the Marcus Corporation, which also owns the Pfister Hotel and the Saint Kate Hotel in Downtown Milwaukee.

History
The hotel opened in 1928 as the Schroeder Hotel. It was owned by hotel magnate Walter Schroeder and designed by Holabird & Roche. Its exterior is in the simplified neo-classical style, while its interiors are Art Deco, with extensive use of hardwoods and intricate decorative metal detailing. The building has 25 floors and 729 rooms.

The Schroeder was sold to Sheraton Hotels in 1966 and renamed the Sheraton-Schroeder Hotel. Sheraton sold the hotel in 1973 to local businessman Ben Marcus, who renamed it the Marc Plaza Hotel. In 1995, the Marcus Corporation brought in Hilton Hotels to manage the property, and it was renamed the Hilton Milwaukee City Center. A 13-floor addition, designed by Kaler Slater Architects and built by Mortenson, was constructed in 2000.
 
It was planned to serve as the headquarters hotel for the 2020 Democratic National Convention, before the COVID-19 pandemic forced a temporary closure, along with major changes to the DNC to a remote format.

In March 2020, the hotel closed due to COVID-19 pandemic. In June 2020, Marc Corporation permanently laid off 79 workers at the Hilton Milwaukee City Center
 
Hilton Milwaukee City Center is a member of Historic Hotels of America, an official program of the National Trust for Historic Preservation.

See also
 Marcus Corporation
 List of Historic Hotels of America

References

External links
 Official website

1928 establishments in Wisconsin
Milwaukee City Center
Skyscraper hotels in Milwaukee
Hotels established in 1928
Hotel buildings completed in 1928
Sheraton hotels
Historic Hotels of America